Kutsinhira Cultural Arts Center is a music center located in Eugene, Oregon, United States, dedicated to the music and people of Zimbabwe.  Kutsinhira offers classes in Zimbabwean marimba, mbira, drumming, singing, and dancing.  The center also tries to bring Zimbabwean teachers to Oregon.  Kutsinhira members have been active participants in ZimFest.

Bands 
Kutsinhira has several marimba ensembles:
Hokoyo
They are directed by Gary Spalter.  In 2006 they released the CD Chipembere.
Zambuko
Jenaguru
Shamwari
Kutsinhira Youth Ensemble

See also
Kutsinhira

References

External links
Kutsinhira Cultural Arts Center (official website)

Culture of Eugene, Oregon
Education in Eugene, Oregon
Marimbists
Southern Africans in the United States
Zimbabwean American